Group Captain George Lovell "Uncle" Denholm,  (20 December 1908 – 15 June 1997) was a Scottish fighter pilot and flying ace of the Royal Air Force during the Second World War. He flew Spitfires during the Battle of Britain, and is counted amongst the ranks of 'The Few'.

Early life
Denholm was born at Tidings Hill in Bo'ness, West Lothian, the son of a coal exporters and pit-prop/timber importer. He attended Cargilfield Preparatory School and Fettes College, and later studied law at St John's College, Cambridge.

At Cambridge, he joined the University Cadet Corps. In 1933, Denholm took an interest in planes and joined No. 603 (City of Edinburgh) Squadron of the Royal Auxiliary Air Force. He took flight training on Airco DH.9A biplanes at RAF Macmerry and RAF East Fortune in East Lothian. In August 1939, Denholm was drafted as a flight commander to 603 Squadron at RAF Drem.

RAF career

RAF Drem
By the start of the Second World War, Denholm had converted to fly the new Mk.I Spitfire. It was whilst on combat patrol in his Spitfire on 16 October 1939 that he shared in the shooting down of a Heinkel He 111 (which was attempting to bomb the Forth Railway Bridge) near Port Seton in East Lothian. It was the first German bomber to be shot down over Great Britain in the Second World War. On 12 March 1940 he damaged a Dornier Do 17 off the coast near Aberdeen.

Due to Denholm being 32 at the time, and much older than other pilots in the squadron he was nicknamed "Uncle George".

Battle of Britain
With the Battle of Britain in full swing in the summer of 1940, Denholm's squadron was transferred to RAF Hornchurch in southern England. Flying regular bomber interception sorties, Denholm claimed a probable He 111 on 26 June and shared Junkers Ju 88 on 3 July, plus a Messerschmitt Bf 109 destroyed and another probable on 28 August. On 30 August, whilst in combat with Bf 110s over Snargate in Kent he was shot down but managed to bail out.

Two days later (1 September 1940), Denholm was back in action, and claimed a Bf 109 damaged. On 15 September claimed two Do 17's and a single Bf 109 damaged. However, it was during this sortie that he himself was shot down. His Spitfire crashed at Warren Farm, Fairlight, East Sussex, but he came down safely at Guestling.

Another damaged Bf 109 was claimed by Denholm on the 18th of September and on the 27th of September. He shared a Bf 109 destroyed (plus a probable Bf 109 and a shared probable Bf 109). On the 20th of October, 1940 he damaged another Bf 109.

On the 22nd of October 1940, acting Squadron Leader Denholm was awarded the DFC. His citation in the London Gazette read:

On the 11th of November he shot down and destroyed a Bf 109, and on November the 29th he shot down another Bf 110.

In April 1941, he relinquished command of No. 603 Squadron and was posted as Fighter Controller to the Operations Room at RAF Turnhouse in Edinburgh. On 10 May 1941, Denholm was on duty when Rudolf Hess's Bf 110 was intercepted over Scotland and the Reich Deputy Führer was arrested.

Later commands
In mid-December 1941 Denhom was posted as commander of No. 1460 Flight RAF at RAF Acklington with Turbinlite searchlights fitted to British Douglas Havoc night fighters. He latter remarked that the experiment was a great success.

In March 1942 he was posted as commander of No. 605 Squadron RAF at RAF Ford. The squadron was equipped with de Havilland Mosquito fighter-bombers and were tasked in the run up to D-Day in June 1944 with strafing enemy positions in the Pas-de-Calais area and throughout northern France. Low flying was a perilous activity and the squadron suffered many losses.

Denholm subsequently became the Station Commander at RAF North Weald, where Norwegian and Danish squadrons operated. He developed a close friendship with the Norwegian Commanding Officer, Helge Mehre, and Denholm accompanied him at the end of the war to receive the German surrender in Norway at Gardermoen outside Oslo.

Denholm's last 'kill' came on 11 March 1943 when he shot down an unidentified enemy aircraft over Gilze-Rijen in the Netherlands. In January 1945 he was awarded a Mention in Despatches and stayed with the RAF until discharged in 1947 as a group captain.

Richard Hillary
Denholm had been Richard Hillary's senior commander at No. 603 Squadron, and Hillary had written about how highly regarded "Uncle George" was in his 1943 memoir The Last Enemy. Hillary had been severely burnt after bailing out of a plane but managed to get back into active service. However, on 18 January 1943 he was killed along with his navigator when their Bristol Blenheim crashed during a night training exercise. Following the cremation of Hillary's body at Golders Green, it was Denholm who scattered his ashes over the English Channel.

Air combat record
Denholm ended the war an ace, claiming 6 confirmed destroyed (4 destroyed and 4 shared), 3 probables, 1 shared probable and 5 damaged.

Post war
Denholm returned to the family business, J & J Denholm, and in the 1950s was briefly a member of Bo’ness Municipal Council. He married Betty Tooms in 1939. They had two sons and two daughters.

References

External links
Battle of Britain Memorial Flight
Saluting the few: the remarkable story of Edinburgh's 603 squadron

1908 births
1997 deaths
People from Bo'ness
People educated at Cargilfield School
People educated at Fettes College
Alumni of St John's College, Cambridge
Recipients of the Distinguished Flying Cross (United Kingdom)
Royal Air Force officers
Royal Air Force pilots of World War II
British World War II flying aces
Scottish flying aces
Shot-down aviators
The Few